Edward Ray Fiori (born April 21, 1953) is an American professional golfer who has played on the PGA Tour and the Champions Tour.

Fiori was born in Lynwood, California. As a youth, Fiori would sneak through a barbed wire fence to a nine-hole course near his Downey, California home to practice his game. He attended the University of Houston where he played on the golf team. He turned pro in 1977 and joined the PGA Tour in 1978.

Fiori won four tournaments on the PGA Tour. His first win was at the 1979 Southern Open. His last victory at the 1996 Quad City Classic led to the postponement of his plans to retire from the game and become a charter-boat captain. Fiori's previous PGA tour victory was 14 years earlier, at the 1982 Bob Hope Desert Classic. Fiori's victory at Quad Cities denied a rookie Tiger Woods his first title.  This would be the only time in his career that Woods would fail to win with an outright 54-hole lead until Y. E. Yang outplayed him in the 2009 PGA Championship.

At 5 feet 7 inches tall and 220 pounds, Fiori is a stocky man; and in recent years has been plagued with a host of weight-related health problems that have affected his play and limited his playing time, including spinal fusion surgery. Fiori is nicknamed "The Grip" because of his unusually strong grip on the club. He lives in the Houston suburb of Sugar Land, Texas.

Professional wins (8)

PGA Tour wins (4)

PGA Tour playoff record (2–0)

Other wins (2)
1981 Southern California Open
1984 Jerry Ford Invitational

Champions Tour wins (1)

Champions Tour playoff record (1–0)

Results in major championships

Note: Fiori never played in The Open Championship.

CUT = missed the half-way cut
"T" = tied

See also 

 Fall 1977 PGA Tour Qualifying School graduates

References

External links

American male golfers
Houston Cougars men's golfers
PGA Tour golfers
PGA Tour Champions golfers
Golfers from California
Golfers from Texas
People from Lynwood, California
Sportspeople from Downey, California
People from Sugar Land, Texas
1953 births
Living people